Aluminium selenide is the inorganic compound with the formula Al2Se3.

Preparation
It is a solid prepared by igniting a mixture of the elements at :
2 Al  +  3 Se  →   Al2Se3
The pure compound is white, but typical samples are coloured.  Samples of aluminium selenide must be protected from moisture, because the compound hydrolyzes readily, giving off highly toxic hydrogen selenide gas:
Al2Se3  +  3 H2O   →   Al2O3  +  3 H2Se

Uses
Al2Se3 has been used as a precursor to hydrogen selenide, which is released when the solid is treated with acids.

Safety
Aluminium selenide should be stored and handled away from moisture and air.

References

Selenides
Aluminium compounds